Events from the year 2004 in France.

Incumbents
 President – Jacques Chirac
 Prime Minister – Jean-Pierre Raffarin

Events
3 January – Flash Airlines Flight 604 headed for Cairo crashes into the Red Sea. All 148 people on board are killed, of whom more than 120 were French tourists.
30 January – Former Prime Minister and current Mayor of Bordeaux, Alain Juppe, is convicted of a party funding scam in the 1980s and early 1990s.
31 January – Air France and British Airways cancel five upcoming US flights to Washington, D.C. and Miami, Florida amid fears of Al-Qaida.
10 February – The French National Assembly votes to pass a law banning religious items and clothing from schools.
20 February – The insecticide Regent (fipronil), from BASF, is banned in France for its implication in pollinator decline.
1 March – French troops are deployed to Haiti.
21–28 March – Regional elections held, in which the government of Prime Minister Jean-Pierre Raffarin suffers a stunning and unprecedented defeat.
5 April – Elizabeth II, Queen of the United Kingdom, begins a state visit to France in honour of the centennial of the Entente Cordiale. The following day, she addresses the French Senate.
23 April – The last coal mine in France closes, La Houve near Creutzwald, ending nearly 300 years of coal mining.
23 May – A section of the ceiling in Terminal 2E at Paris's Charles de Gaulle Airport collapses, claiming at least 6 lives.
27 May – Peugeot launches the 407 range of sedans, estates and coupes. It replaces the successful 406.
8 June – The pickled heart of Louis XVII of France is buried in the royal crypt at Saint-Denis.
13 June – European Parliament election in France.
July – France released five of six suspects after their repatriation from Guantanamo Bay detainment camp.
26 September – Senate election held.
6 November – Clash between the armed forces of Côte d'Ivoire and French peacekeepers takes place (see: 2004 Ivorian-French violence).
14 December – The world's tallest bridge, the Millau bridge over the river Tarn in the Massif Central mountains, is opened by President Jacques Chirac
26 December – 95 French people are among thousands of people killed and 189 seriously injured by the 2004 Indian Ocean tsunami.

Arts and literature
31 October – Denoël in Paris publishes Irène Némirovsky's Suite française, consisting of two novellas, Tempête en juin and Dolce, written and set in 1940–1941, from a sequence left unfinished on the author's death in Auschwitz concentration camp in 1942.

Sport
3 July – Tour de France begins.
4 July – French Grand Prix won by Michael Schumacher of Germany.
25 July – Tour de France ends, won by Lance Armstrong of the United States.

Births
 10 October – Alice Huynh, businesswoman

Deaths

January to March
3 January – Pierre Flamion, soccer player and manager (born 1924).
8 January – Franck Ténot, press agent, pataphysician and jazz critic (born 1925).
15 January
Robert-Ambroise-Marie Carré, priest and author (born 1908).
André Barrais, basketball player (born 1920).
22 January – Ticky Holgado, actor (born 1944).
13 February – François Tavenas, academic in Canada (born 1942).
18 February – Jean Rouch, filmmaker and anthropologist (born 1917).
21 February – Alex Métayer, comedian.
25 February – Jacques Georges, soccer administrator (born 1916).
4 March – Claude Nougaro, singer and songwriter (born 1929).
13 March – René Laloux, animator and film director (born 1929).
28 March – Robert Merle, novelist (born 1908).

April to June
25 April – Jacques Rouxel, animator (born 1931).
28 April – Patrick Berhault, mountain climber.
April – Daniel Bernard, diplomat (born 1941).
1 May Jean-Jacques Laffont, economist (born 1947).
2 May – Paul Guimard, writer (born 1921).
28 May – Jean-Philippe Charbonnier, photographer (born 1921).
29 May – Gérard de Sède, author (born 1921).
31 May – Étienne Roda-Gil, songwriter and screenwriter (born 1941).
10 June – Antoine Argoud, twice attempted to assassinate Charles de Gaulle (born 1914).
11 June – Michel Roche, equestrian (born 1939).
18 June – André Gillois, writer and radio pioneer (born 1902).

July to September
9 July – Jean Lefebvre, actor (born 1919).
17 July – Lucien Leduc, soccer player and manager (born 1918).
18 July – Émile Peynaud, oenologist and researcher (born 1912).
24 July – Claude Ballif, composer (born 1924).
28 July – Bernard Saint-Hillier, General (born 1911).
3 August – Henri Cartier-Bresson, photographer (born 1908).
4 August – Cécile Guillame, first woman who engraved French postal stamps (born 1933).
9 August – Robert Lecourt, jurist, fourth President of the European Court of Justice (born 1908).
17 August – Gérard Souzay, baritone (born 1918).
20 August – Amelie Delagrange, murder victim (born 1982).
29 August – Jean-Louis Nicot, Air Force officer involved in the Algiers putsch (born 1911).
8 September – Raymond Marcellin, politician (born 1914).
9 September – Jean-Daniel Pollet, film director and screenwriter (born 1936).
24 September – Françoise Sagan, playwright, novelist and screenwriter (born 1935).
25 September – Alain Glavieux, professor in electrical engineering.
29 September – Richard Sainct, Rally Raid Motorcycle rider (born 1970).

October to December
October – Jacques Noël, fencer (born 1920).
3 October – Jacques Benveniste, immunologist (born 1935).
8 October – Jacques Derrida, philosopher (born 1930).
22 October – Louis Bouyer, priest and writer (born 1913).
27 October
Pierre Béarn, writer (born 1902).
Claude Helffer, pianist (born 1922).
26 November – Philippe de Broca, film director (born 1933).
31 December – Gérard Debreu, economist and mathematician, won 1983 Nobel Memorial Prize in Economics (born 1921).

See also
 2004 in French television
 List of French films of 2004

References

2000s in France